Rodolfo "Rudy" Francisco Acuña, Ph.D., (born May 18, 1932) is an American historian, professor emeritus at California State University, Northridge, and a scholar of Chicano studies. He authored the 1972 book Occupied America: A History of Chicanos, approaching history of the Southwestern United States with a heavy emphasis on Mexican Americans. An eighth edition was published in 2014. Acuña has also written for the Los Angeles Times, The Los Angeles Herald-Express, La Opinión, and numerous other newspapers. His work emphasizes the struggles of Mexican American people. Acuña is an activist and he has supported numerous causes of the Chicano Movement. He currently teaches an on-line history course at California State University, Northridge.

Early life 
Acuña was born in Los Angeles, California in 1932 to Alicia Elías who was from Sonora, Mexico. His father was from Cocula, Jalisco.

Acuña says his academic counselor advised him to teach "Spanish" or "Physical Education" because "Mexicans don't have a history." This infuriated him, an outrage that motivated him to pursue a doctorate in history. His specialty was northern Mexico and the Mexican origin of people in the United States. His study led to his participation in the movement to begin Chicano Studies, giving a voice to Mexican Americans in education and history.
Is married to Guadalupe Compean.

An Educator 

In 1958 Acuña began teaching at San Fernando Junior High, transferring later to Cleveland High School where he taught social studies until 1965 when he received a tenured position at Los Angeles Pierce College. He also taught adult high school to pay for his doctoral studies at the University of Southern California during which time he was active with the Latin American Civic Association and the Mexican American Political Association.  He was the founding chair of the California State University, Northridge's Chicano/a Studies department, and his teachings began there in 1969. The CSUN Chicana/o Studies Department at CSUN presently has 28 tenured professors and offers 166 sections of Chicana/o per semester.

In 1989, Acuña was a founding member of the Labor/Community Strategy Center, a civil rights advocacy group. Two years later he traveled to El Salvador as a correspondent for the Texas Observer covering its presidential elections. He has always sought to fulfill his lifelong query as to "how accurate were the interpretations of historians of the past", their reliability and objectivity.  His books and lectures analyze and cross examine this query from his study of documents and life experiences.

Acuña continues to call himself a Chicano because "Words have meanings, meanings that are supposed to be linked to reality. In creating a historical narrative the meanings should be clear and best describe the reality of the times. Meanings can be obscured for political purposes; we often call this doublespeak; we say one thing and mean another. The Chicana/o Public Scholar argues that the word Chicana/o best describes the area of studies called Chicana/o Studies and expresses the idealism that we as a community should be striving for. Foremost Acuña prefers to be known as a teacher, having taught four to five classes per semester for most of his career.

U.S. Latino issues 
At a lecture celebrating the release of his book US Latinos: An Inquiry (Greenwood Press, 2003) in 2003, he critically addressed  U.S. Latino Issues and the Latino label or identity.  He delves deeply into what exactly defines a nation or culture; their similarities and differences; and what life experiences are necessary to differentiate one ethnocultural group from another. In his book he clearly notes the mistaken trend of describing a large and heterogeneous group like people of Latin American descent in the US under labels like Latino. He acknowledges the fact that many people are actually opposed to the term and that the media has arbitrary and whimsically imposed Hispanic and Latino as absolute and monolithic ethnic groups:

In 2008, Acuña and his wife Guadalupe Compeán edited a three volume anthology titled Voices of the U.S. Latino Experience (Greenwood Press). The work is the basis of his history of Chicana/o Studies at CSUN entitled In the Trenches of Academe where Acuña—based on his study of over 2000 documents on Latinos living in the United States—concludes that as yet there is no Latino History.  He loosely builds on the points raised in Marx's National Question. His 2007, Corridors of Migration: Odyssey of Mexican Laborers, 1600-1933(Arizona 2007) breaks new ground in the transborder study of Chicano history, using documents on both sides of the border to document and explore the early urbanization and proletarianization of Mexican workers.

"Is Antonio Banderas Latino?"

During a lecture titled "Is Antonio Banderas Latino?" at Swarthmore College, his studies of the race, age, history and class of the Chicano identity were compared and contrasted to the definition of the alleged Latino identity of U.S.A.  His question "should a Spaniard get affirmative action for Latinos without the life experience?"—where life experience meant that one needed to suffer discrimination—was answered no. This has been a recurring theme in his work: that civil rights entitlements are not automatic, but reserved for those who have historically experienced racial and class discrimination. No matter what people may think of Banderas as a person, he is European and not part of a class that has historically suffered discrimination. In 2002, Acuña opposed the nomination of Miguel Estrada, a Honduran immigrant whose father owned a plantation in Honduras, to the Washington, D.C., Circuit Court.

Discrimination
In 1992 Acuña sued the University of California, Santa Barbara for discrimination; the judge dropped the race discrimination cause of action; the political cause of action had previously been dropped because it missed the statute of limitations filing. A jury found that Acuña had been discriminated on the basis of his age, but Federal Judge Audrey Collins refused to compel the University to hire him, instead awarding him a monetary compensation of $325,000, which Acuña used to establish a foundation that he, his wife and his supporters started to help the victims of employment discrimination in higher education. The For Chicana Chicano Studies Foundation recently launched a web site. Aside from awarding tens of thousands of awards for court costs the foundation gives an average of $7,500 annually in scholarships.

Legacy

Acuña's archives are held in the Special Collections and Archives section of the Library at California State University, Northridge.

Honors 
 Outstanding Academic Title by CHOICE Magazine for Corridors of Migration: The Odyssey of Mexican Laborers, 1600–1933, 2009
 National Hispanic Institute, Lifetime Achievement Award, Austin, Texas, 2008
 Community Coalition South Central Los Angeles, 9th Annual Gala Dinner, Activist-scholar award, 2008
 The Labor/Community Strategy Center Award, May 2007
 Center for the Study of Political Graphics (CSPG), Historian of the Lions Award at 18th Anniversary Dinner in Los Angeles on Saturday, October 13, 2007
 National Hispanic Hero Award, March 11, 2006, Chicago, 24th Annual National Conference. United States Hispanic Leadership Institute,
 LA Weekly LA People 2006, April 21–27, 2006, p. 108, Featured as one of 100 LA shakers and movers
 Symposium on the Works of Rodolfo F. Acuna, California State Northridge, May 2005
 Selected As One of the "100 Most Influential Educators of the 20th Century," Black Issues In Higher Education
 Recipient of the Gustavus Myers Award for an Outstanding Book on Race Relations in North America
 Distinguished Scholar Award, National Association of Chicana and Chicano Studies
 Homenaje University of Guadalajara Feria Internacional del Libro de Guadalupe and the State of Guadalajara Mexico for the Outstanding Scholar of U.S.-Mexico Studies
 Emil Freed Award for Community Service, Southern California Library for Social Studies and Research
 Founder's Award for Community Service, Liberty Hill Foundation
 American Council of Learned Societies Award
 Rockefeller Humanities Fellowship

References

Bibliography
2017   Assault on Mexican American Collective Memory, 2010–2015: Swimming with Sharks. Lexington Books.
2008	Voices of the U.S. Latino Experience [Three Volumes]. Greenwood Press.
2007	Corridors of Migration: Odyssey of Mexican Laborers, 1600-1933. University of Arizona Press.	
2007	Occupied America: A History of Chicanos. 6th edition. New York: Longman . 
2004	US Latinos Issues.  Greenwood Press. 
2004	Occupied America: A History of Chicanos. 5th edition. New York: Longman.  
2000	Occupied America: A History of Chicanos. 4th edition. New York: Addison, Wesley & Longman.
1998	Sometimes There is No Other Side: Essays on Truth and Objectivity.  Notre Dame: University of Notre Dame Press.  291 pp. Honorable Mention for Gustavus Myers Award for an Outstanding Book on Race Relations in North America. 
1997     Truth and Objectivity and Chicano history.  East Lansing: Julian Samora Research Institute, Michigan State University.  
1996	Anything But Mexican: Chicanos in Contemporary Los Angeles. London: Verso Press, 1996. 320 pp. Recipient of the Gustavus Myers Award for an Outstanding Book on Race Relations in North America.  
1988 	Occupied America: A History of Chicano. 3d Edition.  New York: Harper and Row. 475 pp. Recipient of the Gustavus Myers Award for an Outstanding Book on Race Relations in North America.
1988	Sound Recording: Occupied America a history of Chicanos. Publication: Salt Lake City, Utah : Utah State Library Division for the Blind and Physically Handicapped.  Cassette tape.
1984 	Community Under Siege: A Chronicle of Chicanos East of the Los Angeles River, 1945-1975.  UCLA. 560pp. 
1981	El Caudillo Sonorense: Ignacio Pesqueira y sus tiempos.  Mexico D.F.: ERA. 191 pp.
1980 	Occupied America: A History of Chicanos. 2nd Edition.  New York: Harper & Row. 437 pp.
1976 	America Ocupada. Ediciones ERA. 342 pp.
1974 	Sonoran Strongman: The Times of Ignacio Pesqueira. Tucson: University of Arizona Press. 179 pp. 
1972 	Occupied America: The Chicano Struggle Toward Liberation. New York: Harper & Ro., 282 pp.
1971     The story of the Mexican Americans; the men and the land.  Sacramento: California State Dept. of Education. 
1970 	Cultures in Conflict: Case Studies of the Mexican American.  Los Angeles: Charter Books. 140 pp.
1970 	A Mexican American Chronicle. New York: American Book Co. 210 pp.
1969 	The Story of the Mexican American. New York: American Book Co. 140 pp.

External links 
Rodolfo Acuna at CSUN
"Anything but Mexican: Chicanos in Contemporary Los Angeles", biography from Verso books.
 For Chicana Chicano Studies Foundation, http://forchicanachicanostudies.wikispaces.com/
Corridors of Migration: Odyssey of Mexican Laborers, 1600-1933 (University of Arizona Press Dec 2007) http://www.uapress.arizona.edu/BOOKS/bid1858.htm
Voices of the U.S. Latino Experience Three volumes(Greenwood 2008)http://www.greenwood.com/books/printFlyer.aspx?sku=GR4020
Portrait of Rodolfo F. Acuña, Chicano scholar, California, 1989. Los Angeles Times Photographic Archive (Collection 1429). UCLA Library Special Collections, Charles E. Young Research Library, University of California, Los Angeles.

Chicano
American academics of Mexican descent
American writers of Mexican descent
California State University, Northridge faculty
California State University, Northridge alumni
Activists for Hispanic and Latino American civil rights
Cultural historians
Hispanic and Latino American history
1932 births
Living people
Los Angeles Pierce College people
Activists from Los Angeles
Writers from Los Angeles